Grass is a sitcom starring Simon Day which originally aired in 2003 on BBC Three. Day plays Billy Bleach, a Londoner and pub know-it-all who is relocated to Norfolk in rural England under a witness protection programme after he witnesses a gangland killing. The series was a spin-off from The Fast Show.

Cast
Simon Day as Billy Bleach
Robert Wilfort as PC Harriet
Philip Jackson as DCI Maddox
Tristan Gemmill as DI Veal
Matthew Ashforde as Darren
Josephine Butler as Jemima
David Webber as Youssou
Mark Williams as Ben
William Thomas as Eric
Vilma Hollingbery as Rose
Liam Hess as Crispin
Alex Lowe as Roland
Andrew Clover as David the Poacher
Lynette McMorrough as Mrs. Harriet

References

British Sitcom Guide entry on Grass

BBC television sitcoms
2003 British television series debuts
2003 British television series endings
2000s British sitcoms
Television series about witness protection
English-language television shows
The Fast Show
Television series based on comedy sketches